Howard Mossman Acher (December 10, 1889 – May 10, 1957) was an American football and basketball player coach. He attended Grove City College, where he played football, basketball and tennis. He was hired as a coach at Grove City College in July 1915. He served as the head football coach at Grove City in 1916 and 1919 and as head basketball coach from 1915 to 1917 and 1918 to 1920. He next served at the University of Tulsa from 1922 to 1925. He was also the head football coach for the Tulsa Golden Hurricane football team during the 1922, 1923 and 1924 seasons.

Head coaching record

Football

References

External links
 

1889 births
1957 deaths
Basketball coaches from Ohio
Grove City Wolverines football coaches
Grove City Wolverines football players
Grove City Wolverines men's basketball coaches
Tulsa Golden Hurricane football coaches
Tulsa Golden Hurricane men's basketball coaches
Sportspeople from Cleveland
Players of American football from Cleveland